Eugenia  is a metro station along Line 3 of the Mexico City Metro.  It is located in the Colonia Vertiz Narvarte and Colonia del Valle neighbourhoods of the Benito Juárez borough of Mexico City.

The station logo depicts a stork, and its name refers to the avenue above the station. The name Eugenia literally means "The well born", so the stork is a birth symbol.  The station opened on 25 August 1980.

Until trolleybus service was discontinued in 2010, this metro station offered transfers to the "O" line of the trolleybus, which ran between Metro San Antonio and Central de Abasto wholesale market located in Iztacalco borough.

Eugenia serves the Vertiz Narvarte and del Valle neighborhoods. It is located at the crossing of Eje 5 Sur Eugenia and Avenida Cuauhtémoc.

Ridership

References

External links 
 
 

Eugenia
Railway stations opened in 1980
1980 establishments in Mexico
Mexico City Metro stations in Benito Juárez, Mexico City